The National Liberal Youth (TNL) is the youth organisation of the National Liberal Party (PNL) of Romania. It is a nationwide body, as part of the PNL local, county and national organisations.

External links
 Official site

Liberal organizations
Youth
Youth wings of political parties in Romania
Youth wings of liberal parties